Tlapacoya is an important archaeological site in Mexico, located at the foot of the Tlapacoya volcano, southeast of Mexico City, on the former shore of Lake Chalco.  Tlapacoya was a major site for the Tlatilco culture.

Tlapacoya is known in particular for Tlapacoya figurines.  These sophisticated earthware figurines were generally created between 1500 and 300 BCE and are representative of the Preclassic Period.

Tlapacoya was also a manufacturing center for so-called "Dragon Pots" (see photo below). These flat-bottomed cylindrical bowls have white or buff surfaces incised with almost abstract Olmec-style drawings, generally of were-jaguars.

Evidence of Earlier Habitation

In addition to the figurines and other artifacts from the 1500 - 300 BCE era, human and animal remains have been found, some of which could be as much as 25,000 years old. 

The most controversial findings in Tlapacoya are artifacts which have been dated by some researchers to as early as 25,000 BP.  If verified, these would be some of the earliest dates for human habitation in the Americas and would discredit prevailing theories of the timing of settlement of the New World. 

The evidence for these much-earlier dates consists of the bones of black bear and two species of deer which appeared in middens associated with 22,000-year-old hearths, as well as a curved obsidian blade which was found beneath a buried tree trunk.  The bones were 24,000 years BP (± 4000 years) and 21,700 years BP (± 500 years). The obsidian blade was found under a tree trunk which dated to 24,000 years BP (± 1000 years) and was itself dated, using the obsidian hydration method, to between 21,250 and 25,000 years BP.

The site was uncovered during the construction of a Mexico City-Puebla freeway and has since been almost obliterated by freeway construction. In 1955, Beatriz Barba, "the first Mexican woman to obtain the title of archaeologist", earned her master's degree with a study of the site. Her thesis, Tlapacoya: un sitio preclásico de transición (Tlapacoya: a pre-classic transitional site) evaluated the social development and religious practices of the Tlatilco culture. Barba's evaluation of the site was one of the first to evaluate the socio-economic and political life of the inhabitants of Tlapacoya within the context of the history of the region, as well as their trade relationships and the influence of other groups upon the development of the Tlatilco people.

Human remains
Silvia González et al. have published research claiming that "one Tlapacoya skull is the first directly dated human in Mexico with an age of 9730 ± 65 years BP" (before present).

See also
Chiquihuite cave
White Sands National Park
Zohapilco
 Human antiquity in Mesoamerica
Christine Niederberger Betton

References
Diehl, Richard A. (2004) The Olmecs: America's First Civilization, Thames & Hudson, London.
 Dixon, E.J. (1999) Bones, Boats & Bison: Archaeology and the First Colonization of Western North America. Albuquerque: University of New Mexico Press.
Gonzalez, S., Huddart, D., Morett-Alatorre, L., Arroyo-Cabrales, J. and Polaco, O.J., 2001. Mammoths and Early Humans in the Basin of Mexico during the Late Pleistocene/Early Holocene. (PDF) The World of Elephants. Proceedings of the 1st International Congress, Rome. G.Cavarretta, P.Gioia, M.Mussi, M.R.Palambo (eds.), 704–706.
 Lorenzo, Jose Luis, and Lorena Mirambell (1999) "The Inhabitants of Mexico During the Upper Pleistocene" in Ice Age People of North America, edited by Robson Bonnichsen and Karen Turnmire, pp. 482–496. Oregon State University Press, Corvallis.
 Lorenzo, Jose Luis, and Lorena Mirambell, Coordinadores (1986) Tlapacoya: 35.000 aZos de Historia del Lago de Chalco. México, D.F. I.N.A.H., collección Científica, Serie Prehistórica, pp. 296.

Notes

External links
Anthropologist K. Kris Hirst discusses Tlapacoya at about.com
Article en Español on Silvia González
Discussion of the pre-Clovis dating at Tlapacoya and further links

Links to figurine photos
"A beautiful example from the early settlement of Tlapacoya . . . with undeniable Olmec inspiration" 
A more primitive figurine
Standing Tlapacoya Pottery Female, Pre Classic Period, ca. 800 to 300 BCE

Archaeological sites in the State of Mexico
Pre-Clovis archaeological sites in the Americas
Tlatilco culture
Oldest human remains in the Americas